is a passenger railway station located in Naka-ku, Yokohama, Japan, operated by East Japan Railway Company (JR East).

Lines
The station is 3.8 km from the starting point of the Negishi Line at Yokohama and 62.9 km from the starting point of the Keihin-Tōhoku Line at Ōmiya.

Station layout
Ishikawachō Station has two elevated opposed side platforms serving two tracks with the station building underneath. The station has a "Midori no Madoguchi" staffed ticket office.

Platforms

History
Ishikawachō Station opened on May 19, 1964, as a station on the Japanese National Railways (JNR). The station was absorbed into the JR East network upon the privatization of JNR on 1 April 1987.

Due to confusion generated from which station on the Negishi Line was closest to Motomachi and the local Chinatown, the station signage and the visual train announcements were changed on September 15, 2016 to read . Despite the station's now similar name to Motomachi-Chūkagai Station on the Minato Mirai Line, the two stations are located relatively far from each other.

Passenger statistics
In fiscal 2019, the station was used by an average of 23,377 passengers daily (boarding passengers only).

The passenger figures (boarding passengers only) for previous years are as shown below.

Surrounding area
The station is located near the Motomachi and Yokohama Chinatown tourist areas in Yokohama. However, Motomachi-Chūkagai Station on the Minato Mirai Line, which opened in 2004, is closer to those locations.

See also
 List of railway stations in Japan

References

External links

 

Railway stations in Kanagawa Prefecture
Naka-ku, Yokohama
Keihin-Tōhoku Line
Negishi Line
Railway stations in Japan opened in 1964
Railway stations in Yokohama